Alex Pereira Lopes (born May 16, 1989) is a Brazilian footballer who acts as a defender and plays for Duque de Caxias.

Career
Lopes was recruited in the Botafogo youth ranks the player competed in the tournament Otávio Pinto Guimaraes where he was one of the highlights of the team in 2008. In the same year, he competed in the Campeonato Brasileiro Sub-20.

In 2009, he arrived at the team's professional alvinegro at the request of coach Ney Franco  and played in the 2009 Campeonato Brasileiro Série A.

Lopes currently plays for Botafogo.

References

1989 births
Living people
Brazilian footballers
Campeonato Brasileiro Série A players
Association football defenders
Botafogo de Futebol e Regatas players
Duque de Caxias Futebol Clube players
Bangu Atlético Clube players
Estanciano Esporte Clube players
People from Nova Iguaçu
Sportspeople from Rio de Janeiro (state)